Mr. Olympia is the title awarded to the winner of the professional men's bodybuilding contest at Joe Weider's Olympia Fitness & Performance Weekend—an international bodybuilding competition that is held annually and is sanctioned by the IFBB Professional League. Joe Weider created the contest to enable the Mr. Universe winners to continue competing and to earn money. The first Mr. Olympia was held on September 18, 1965, at the Brooklyn Academy of Music, New York City, with Larry Scott winning his first of two straight titles.

The record number of wins is eight each by Lee Haney (1984–1991) and Ronnie Coleman (1998–2005). Hadi Choopan currently holds the title.

The film Pumping Iron (1977) featured the buildup to the 1975 Mr. Olympia in Pretoria, South Africa, and helped launch the acting careers of Arnold Schwarzenegger, Lou Ferrigno, and Franco Columbu.

There is also a female bodybuilder crowned, Ms. Olympia, as well as winners of Fitness Olympia and Figure Olympia for fitness and figure competitors. All four contests occur during the same weekend. From 1994 to 2003, and again in 2012, a Masters Olympia was also crowned. Globally, a version with amateur competitors is also presented, the Mr. Olympia Amateur.

History

1960s 
The 1965 and 1966 Mr. Olympia were won by Larry Scott, a famous bodybuilder of the time. Scott subsequently retired after his 1966 victory, and to date is the only Mr. Olympia champion to have never lost a Mr. Olympia competition.

Harold Poole holds two Mr. Olympia distinctions : one is that he is the youngest ever competitor to have participated in the Olympia—in 1965 he competed in the first Mr. Olympia at the age of 21; the other is that he was the only man to compete in all three of the initial Mr. Olympia contests.

The 1967 Mr. Olympia, won by Sergio Oliva, heralded a new era in bodybuilding competition. At 5 ft 10 ins and 240 lbs Oliva, nicknamed "The Myth", displayed an unforeseen level of muscle mass and definition, including a "V" shape of a large and a well-formed upper-body that tapered down to a narrow waist.

Oliva would go on to win the Mr. Olympia competition in 1967, 1968 (uncontested), and 1969—where he would defeat Arnold Schwarzenegger four to three, marking Schwarzenegger's only loss in a Mr. Olympia competition.

1970s 
Schwarzenegger defeated Oliva at the 1970 Mr. Olympia after finishing second the year before, and also won in 1971 (being the only competitor). He defeated Oliva again in 1972, and went on to win the next three Mr. Olympia competitions, including the 1975 edition, which was highlighted in the 1977 docudrama Pumping Iron and featured other notable bodybuilders such as Lou Ferrigno, Serge Nubret, and Franco Columbu, who would go on to win the 1976 and 1981 competitions.

From 1974 until 1979, a dual weight division system was used, splitting competitors into two categories: "Heavyweights" (over 200lbs) and "Lightweights" (under 200lbs). The winners of each division would then compete against each other to decide an overall champion.

After winning the 1975 competition, Schwarzenegger announced his retirement from competitive bodybuilding; this was also depicted in Pumping Iron.

Frank Zane won the 1977, 1978, and 1979 competitions. 1976 was the first year the Sandow trophy was awarded.

1980s 
In 1980, Schwarzenegger came out of retirement to win the Olympia yet again, after a five-year hiatus. Schwarzenegger (who was supposedly training for his "Conan" movie) had been a late entry into the competition, and his competitors did not know of his intentions to compete. This seventh victory was especially controversial, as most fellow competitors and observers felt that he lacked both muscle mass and conditioning, and shouldn't have won over Chris Dickerson or Mike Mentzer. Several athletes vowed to boycott the contest the following year, and Mentzer retired for good.

The following year, Franco Columbu was victorious for the second time. Chris Dickerson won his only title in 1982, making him the first openly gay Mr. Olympia, and Samir Bannout won his only title in 1983. Then in 1984 Lee Haney won the first of 8 straight Mr. Olympia titles.

1990s 
Haney retired from competitive bodybuilding after his last Mr. Olympia victory in 1991. Having placed second to Haney the previous year, Dorian Yates won the competition six straight times from 1992 until 1997. Dorian is given credit for revolutionizing the sport during his reign as Mr. Olympia by combining larger mass than seen before with what was dubbed "granite hardness".

In the 1990s, the use of growth hormones by bodybuilders was reported, and they started to appear in competitions with an increasing physical size. Writing for Men's Health in 2016, journalist Lou Schuler questioned whether Mr. Olympia Ronnie Coleman competed "naturally" or used hormones.

Yates retired from competitive bodybuilding after his 1997 victory, having accumulated several injuries. Ronnie Coleman, who placed 9th in 1997, surprised everyone with a much improved physique in 1998, winning the first of 8 consecutive titles.

In 1994, a separate Masters Olympia competition for professional bodybuilders was created, to compete at the highest levels in their later years.

2000s 

Ronnie Coleman won the Mr. Olympia competition eight consecutive times, tying the record set by Lee Haney. Coleman, nicknamed "The King", is widely regarded as the greatest bodybuilder in Olympia history and began the mass monster era. Coleman returned in 2006 to try to beat the record for Olympia wins but was unable even to defend his title, instead placed second to Jay Cutler, who won his first title after four consecutive years of finishing second to Coleman. Cutler successfully defended his title in 2007. Coleman came in fourth place and announced his retirement from competition, ending one of the biggest rivalries in the competition's history.

In 2008, Dexter Jackson defeated Jay Cutler and became Mr. Olympia. In 2009, Jay Cutler returned and regained the title.

2010s 
In 2010, Cutler returned to claim his fourth Mr. Olympia title, becoming the fifth competitor in Olympia history to win the title more than three times. In 2011, Phil Heath defeated Cutler for the title, beginning a winning streak that lasted until 2018. From 2012 to 2014, the Olympia was dominated by the rivalry between Kai Greene and Heath, with Heath winning all three and Greene placing second.

Starting in 2016, a new division called Classic Physique was introduced. Danny Hester was the inaugural champion in Classic Physique division.

Heath won his seventh-consecutive Mr. Olympia in 2017, with Mamdouh Elssbiay taking second. With his 2017 win, Heath tied Arnold Schwarzenegger for second most Olympia victories, behind Lee Haney and Ronnie Coleman who won eight.

Shawn Rhoden defeated Phil Heath in 2018, snapping Heath's streak of seven victories. The 2019 Mr. Olympia was won by Brandon Curry.

Starting in 2018, a new division called Wheelchair Olympia was added.

2020s 
In 2020 Phil Heath returned for an attempted record-tying eighth title, but Mamdouh Elssbiay won the Olympia for his first title. Elssbiay won for the second time in 2021. Hadi Choopan took home the title in 2022.

Qualifying 
The IFBB selects Olympia contestants from among the highest-placed competitors at various qualifying competitions, collectively referred to as the Olympia Qualifying Season. The qualifying season for each Olympia runs for a year, and ends a few months before the competition. Under updated qualifying rules announced by the IFBB in 2019, to qualify for most divisions at the Olympia an IFBB athlete must meet one of the following criteria:

 Place in the top five in their division at the previous Olympia
 Win any of the IFBB qualifying contests
 Rank among the top three in total points awarded for second through fifth place at qualifying competitions

For certain divisions with more than 25 qualifying competitions, slightly different rules are used: The previous Olympia winner is automatically qualified, plus the winner of each qualifying competition and the top five in total points.

The IFBB Professional League also has the discretion to extend special invitations to other competitors.

Winners

Chronologically

Number of overall wins

Number of consecutive wins

Top 3

Medals

Classic Physique

Chronologically

Top 3

Men's 212 division

Men's Physique

Mr. Olympia Amateur 
Mr. Olympia Amateur is a competition that globally awards the best amateur competitors with an IFBB Pro Card, bringing them closer to competing in the main Mr. Olympia. According to the official website as of March 2022, the event is presented in regions with a specific organization around the world: Pakistan, Eastern Europe, Beijing (China), Spain, Portugal, Brazil, South Korea, Italy, Japan,  South America, India, Las Vegas (USA).

See also
 Ms. Olympia

Further reading

References

External links

 

 
Professional bodybuilding competitions
Recurring sporting events established in 1965
Olympia Weekend